University Transit Service (UTS) is a fare-free transit system providing service to the University of Virginia's students, faculty, and staff. UTS serves more than 3 million passengers per year and traverses the University of Virginia Central Grounds, University of Virginia Health System, and student housing areas. UTS also provides chartered services for university-sponsored events.

History of UTS
The University Transit Bus System began in 1972 at the same time as the introduction of parking fees at UVA, when fifteen student drivers started a pilot program. The bus system alleviated parking congestion on the Central Grounds and provided an alternative to individual car usage.

The first fleet consisted of four rented buses, but these were replaced by UTS' own fleet in November 1972. From the start, students provided most of the work force (15 students and 3 full-time drivers).  At first, service was provided Monday-Friday 7:30am–12:30am, with the first route running from Copeley Hill Apartments to Scott Stadium. A gate preventing access to the University Law School was removed in order to allow for bus traffic. Eventually, service was expanded to include the Rugby/Grady neighborhood, a popular student housing area. Charter services were available from UTS’ first days of operation.

In 1972, bus passes were required and cost $7.50 per semester.  Students had to purchase these passes separately from parking permits.  On the first full day of service, 3,300 passengers rode the new university buses. UTS provided additional equipment to accommodate standing passengers.

In 1979, the service was extended to include a weekend service after a student referendum to raise the comprehensive transportation fee by $5.  By March 1979, UTS had three routes and 16 buses.   Talks began in 1979 concerning the combination of UTS and CTS.

On August 24, 2020, in response to the COVID-19 pandemic, UTS modified several routes and modified the UVA Health Commuter routes.

Services

GPS Tracking
University Transit Service contracts with TransLoc to provide a mobile app that shows the estimated arrival time and approximate location of each bus according to the GPS tracking system.

Types of service
University Transit Service operates at different service levels dependent on the needs of the students and staff who use the service, as well as the availability of various campus access points.

Full Service
Runs during the fall and spring academic semesters unless otherwise posted. All routes operate during this service level.
Reduced Service
Runs on weekdays only during summer sessions, fall reading days, winter break, and spring break. Reduced frequency on academic routes.
Exam Service
Runs during the fall and spring exam periods. 
Commuter Service
Provides Health System Route service during holidays when clinics are still in operation, such as the workdays before Thanksgiving and after Christmas Day. Only service for UVA Health Commuter Routes.
Football Operations
During home football games, most or all route service is suspended and may not resume until post-game. Throughout the game, UTS operates an accessibility shuttle that runs from the D3 parking lot to Scott Stadium.

Charters
University Transit Service offers Charter Services to accommodate the special transportation needs of various academic groups and affiliates of the University of Virginia. UTS Charters also participates heavily in major events at the University of Virginia such as graduation, home football and basketball games. In response to the COVID-19 Pandemic, UTS has stopped accepting new charter requests.

Connecting transit services
University Transit Service (UTS) works closely with Charlottesville Area Transit and JAUNT. The university provides an annual subsidy for the Charlottesville Free Trolley Route that connects the downtown mall with Central Grounds. The university has an agreement with the city to provide a subsidy that allows staff, faculty, and students to ride city buses fare-free with a valid UVA ID. This open ridership program allows access to the Greyhound bus station and Amtrak's Union Station on West Main Street, encouraging more people to travel by bus and rail. In the 2017 fiscal year, UVA staff, faculty, and students formed just under 24 percent of CAT's ridership.

Routes 
UTS routes are designed to provide service to those that are transit-dependent, rather than those that ride out of convenience. Due to COVID-19, UTS significantly modified their routes, including a new naming system.

Former Routes 
These routes were served by UTS prior to the COVID-19 pandemic.

COVID-19 Response 
UTS made a number of notable changes during the COVID-19 Pandemic, including the following:

 Bus capacity is reduced to 20 passengers, with seating reorganized to maximize social distancing
 Passengers are required to wear face coverings
 A chain has been added to prevent passengers from getting too close to the driver
 Academic routes have been reconfigured to avoid McCormick Road and other areas of short "convenience trips."
 Staff have been added to certain bus stops and onboard certain routes to enforce both the face covering requirement and the 20-passenger limit
UTS rolled back the capacity requirements and rear-door boarding in November 2021.

Fleet Information
The current fleet consists of the following vehicles:

On May 17, 2022, UTS announced the purchase of four new battery electric Proterra ZX5+ buses, with expected delivery in the summer or fall of 2023. The purchase of these buses will advance the university towards its sustainability goals, notably of being fossil fuel free by 2050.

Administration
In addition to student drivers, University Transit Service employs full-time and part-time non-student drivers. All drivers are required to undergo a rigorous training process that satisfies the Virginia Department of Motor Vehicles' requirement for a Commercial Driver's License and teaches them the different routes at UVA. Three official training classes are offered throughout the year during January, May, and August, although  new drivers can be trained one-on-one or in small groups throughout the semester, based on their schedule.  All of the new driver training is performed by current UTS drivers who have been trained by existing trainers. Training is overseen by the Safety and Training Manager.

Supervisory Staff
Each year, new supervisors are chosen from current drivers who apply.  These supervisors manage all drivers that are currently on the road while they are on duty, whether they are student drivers, wage drivers, or full-time drivers. In addition, 0-2 students serve as Student Operations Interns, learning processes and gaining experience of transit management throughout the year in which they serve in that role.

Supervisor Training
Unlike becoming a new driver, there are no training classes for becoming a supervisor.  New supervisors are instead taught on the job for a few weeks by current supervisors.  The previous supervisor acts only in a mentoring capacity and generally does not directly supervise drivers during this time.

Budget
The University Transit Service budget consists of several components: the Mandatory Comprehensive Transportation Fee of $193 (as of the 2020–2021 academic year), and UVA Health System funding.

References

University of Virginia
Bus transportation in Virginia
1972 establishments in Virginia
University and college bus systems